Nasseri is a surname, commonly found in the Persian and Arabic language. Notable people with the surname include:
 Abdollah Nasseri (1992), Iranian football defender
 Abdulla Sultan Al Nasseri (1986), Emirati footballer
 Alireza Ghaleh Nasseri, Iranian Paralympic athlete
 Feizollah Nasseri (1955), retired Iranian weightlifter
 Majid Nasseri (1968), Iranian former cyclist
 Mehran Karimi Nasseri (1946–2022), Iranian refugee
 Mohammad Nasseri (1993), Iranian Football goalkeeper
 Navid Nasseri (1996), Iranian-English footballer
 Reza Nasseri (1975), Iranian retired futsal player and current coach
 Soheil Nasseri (1979), American pianist 
 Yahia Nasseri, Iraqi politician

See also 
 Naceri, another transcription of the surname
 Naseri (disambiguation), another transcription of the same Iranian surname

References 

Persian-language surnames
Arabic-language surnames